The 2015–16 CBA season was the 21st season of the Chinese Basketball Association. The regular season began on Saturday, October 31, 2015, with the Beijing Ducks hosting the Xinjiang Flying Tigers. The regular season ended on Friday, February 5, 2016, and the playoffs began on Monday, February 15, 2016.

Team changes 
Two teams relocated ahead of the season.

Name changes 
The Chongqing Soaring Dragons moved to Beijing and initially changed their name to Beijing BG in September 2015. To avoid confusion with the city's soccer club from the second-tier China League One, which is also called Beijing BG or Beijing Beikong, as well as to avoid confusion with the Beijing Ducks when only the geographical names of CBA teams are used—a large number of Chinese sports websites have decided to refer to the team as the Beikong Fly Dragons (the club's official logo has always used the badly-translated English term "Fly Dragons" instead of "Soaring Dragons"). The practice is consistent with the way a lot of Chinese sports websites shorten the second Zhejiang team's name to Guangsha Lions and the second Jiangsu team's name to Tongxi Monkey Kings. So this means Beikong replaces Beijing as the club's "geographical" designation.
The Dongguan Leopards moved to Shenzhen and changed their name to the Shenzhen Leopards in October 2015.

Regular season

Standings

Foreign Players Policy
All teams except the Bayi Rockets can have two foreign players. The bottom 5 teams from the previous season (except Bayi) have the additional right to sign an extra Asian player.

Rules Chart
The rules for using foreign players in each game are described in this chart:

+ Including players from Hong Kong and Taiwan.

++ If a team waives its right to sign an extra Asian player, it may use its 2 foreign players for 7 quarters collectively.

+++ Only 1 allowed in the 4th quarter.

Import Chart
This is the full list of international players who competed in the CBA during the 2015-16 season.

Statistical Leaders
The CBA statistical leaders list combines numbers from both regular season and playoff games.

Individual statistical leaders

Playoffs
The 2016 CBA Playoffs began on Monday, February 15, 2016.

Bracket

This is the bracket for the 2016 CBA Playoffs.

CBA Awards
Playoffs
CBA Finals MVP:
 Hamed Haddadi (Sichuan Blue Whales)

Regular Season
CBA Domestic MVP
 Yi Jianlian (Guangdong Southern Tigers)
CBA International MVP
 Michael Beasley (Shandong Golden Stars)

All-Star Game
CBA All-Star Game MVP
 Michael Beasley (Shandong Golden Stars)

See also
Chinese Basketball Association

References

External links
CBA Official Website
CBA China - 2015-16 Standings and Stats on Basketball-Reference.com

 
League
Chinese Basketball Association seasons
CBA